Ziemia obiecana is a Polish language name for the Promised Land or the Land of Israel. It may also refer to:

Film, TV or theatrical adaptations 
Ziemia obiecana, The Promised Land (1927 film) 
Ziemia obiecana, The Promised Land (1975 film)
Ziemia obiecana, Polish TV serial from 1978

See also
Promised Land (disambiguation)